Antonio Bonfini (Latin variant: Antonius Bonfinius) (1427‒1502) was an Italian humanist and poet who spent the last years of his career as a court historian in Hungary with King Matthias Corvinus.

Bonfini was commissioned by Matthias Corvinus to produce a work chronicling the History of Hungary. The book was named Historia Pannonica: Sive Hungaricarum Rerum Decades IV.

References

Italian Renaissance humanists
Italian poets
Italian male poets
15th-century Italian historians
Italian biographers
Male biographers
1427 births
1503 deaths
Italian chroniclers
Italian male non-fiction writers
15th-century Latin writers